Southern Pacific 2472 is a P-8 Class 4-6-2 heavy "Pacific" type steam locomotive built by the Baldwin Locomotive Works for Southern Pacific Railroad (SP) in 1921. SP No. 2472 is one of three surviving Southern Pacific P-8 class 4-6-2 Pacific locomotives, the other two bring Nos. 2467 and 2479. The 4-6-2 designation means it has four leading wheels, six driving wheels, and two trailing wheels.

History

Revenue service 
SP 2472 and the other "Pacific" locomotives served the Overland Route from Ogden, Utah, to Oakland, California.

After being replaced by the 4-8-2 "Mountain" type locomotives, 2472 and all other Pacific locomotives were sent to work Sacramento-Oakland passenger trains and San Francisco-San Jose commute trains, along with occasional freight service. This locomotive was retired from regular revenue service on February 7, 1957, during Southern Pacific's dieselization, and on April 10, 1959, 2472 was donated to San Mateo County, which put the unit on static display at the San Mateo County Fairgrounds, it remained there until 1976 when a group of volunteers decided to restore the locomotive.

Excursion service 
Restoration work was completed on April 30, 1991 just in time to participate in Railfair 91, which took place in Sacramento on May 1, 1991, it featured other famous steam locomotives, such as Southern Pacific GS-4  4-8-4 "Northern" 4449, Union Pacific FEF-3 4-8-4 844, Union Pacific 4-6-6-4 "Challenger" 3985, Union Pacific 0-6-0 4466, and British Great Northern Railway J13 0-6-0 tank locomotive 1247. In the 1990s and early 2000s, 2472 pulled several excursions and Caltrain specials such as the "Toys for Tots", and double-headed on an excursion in 1992 (during the NRHS Convention) with the 4449.

SP 2472 received Federal Railroad Administration-mandated boiler work at Hunters Point Naval Base in San Francisco, during 2005–06 when the Golden Gate Railroad Museum (GGRM) was located there. The GGRM and all other tenants at Hunter's Point had to leave the former navy base in 2006 due to redevelopment. The initial equipment move took place in February 2006, although an extended lease on the shop building allowed work to continue on 2472 for ten more months. On December 31, 2006, SP 2472 and the remaining pieces of GGRM rolling stock completed relocation to the Niles Canyon Railway, located in Sunol, California, on the east side of San Francisco Bay.

The locomotive became serviceable in February 2008, and was stored in Niles Canyon at the Brightside Yard between operations. SP 2472 has operated in Niles Canyon, usually on Memorial Day weekends and Labor Day weekends, and on other dates as announced.

In Spring 2015, the Golden Gate Railroad Museum announced that they will be leaving Niles Canyon and SP 2472 would pull the last excursions in Niles Canyon on the 2015 Labor Day weekend. The relocation move of SP 2472 to the Northwestern Pacific Railroad in Schellville, California started on March 1, 2020 when the P-8 Pacific-type steam locomotive, along with two former Southern Pacific Railroad diesel locomotives (both in operating condition) that belong to GGRM, were towed by two Union Pacific locomotives towards Schellville. On October 9, 2021, 2472 was fired up for the first time since 2015. It was scheduled to make its excursion return hauling Labor Day Weekend 2022 trains from September 4th through September 5th before its Federal Railroad Administration (FRA) 1,472 day inspection and overhaul begins, but the event was later canceled and the railroad had the engine fired up for an open house.

See also 

 Southern Pacific 1744
 Southern Pacific 2353
 Southern Pacific 745
 Southern Pacific 786

References

External links

Southern Pacific P-8 No.2472 by Golden Gate Railroad Museum
2472 in Niles Canyon (DVD about the 2008 Memorial Day Weekend Excursion in Niles Canyon)

2472
Baldwin locomotives
4-6-2 locomotives
Individual locomotives of the United States
Transportation in the San Francisco Bay Area
Alameda County, California
Standard gauge locomotives of the United States
Railway locomotives introduced in 1921
Preserved steam locomotives of California